Unami may refer to:

 Unami people, one of the three main divisions of the Lenape Nation
 Unami language, a Delaware language within the Algonquian language family
Unami Creek, a tributary of Perkiomen Creek in Pennsylvania
Unami Lodge, a Boy Scouts of America lodge in Pennsylvania
United Nations Assistance Mission for Iraq, UNAMI
Unami Middle School in the Central Bucks School District, Pennsylvania

See also
Umami, one of the five basic tastes